Cefacetrile (INN, also spelled cephacetrile) is a broad-spectrum first generation cephalosporin antibiotic effective in gram-positive and gram-negative bacterial infections. It is a bacteriostatic antibiotic. Cefacetrile is marketed under the trade names Celospor, Celtol, and Cristacef, and as Vetimast for the treatment of mammary infections in lactating cows.

Synthesis

It was made by reacting 7-ACA (7-aminocephalosporanic acid) with cyanoacetyl chloride in the presence of tributylamine.

References 

Cephalosporin antibiotics
Carboxylate esters
Nitriles
Acetate esters
Carboxamides